Ailm is the Irish name of the sixteenth letter of the Ogham alphabet, ᚐ. Its phonetic value is [a]. The original meaning of the name cannot be established with certainty. The Bríatharogam kennings all refer to the sound [a] and not to the meaning of the letter name, either as the sound of a "groan", or to the Irish vocative particle, á. Thurneysen suggests that Ailm, Beithe was influenced by Alpha, Beta. However, beithe is an Irish word, and there is no reason to consider ailm a sole, loaned letter name among the original feda; Thurneysen did not suggest this letter name involved such a borrowing. The word is attested once outside of the Ogham grammatical texts, in the poem "King Henry and the Hermit",

which translates to
Beautiful are the pines which make music for me.

This single reference is the reason ailm is sometimes associated with pines. However, the poem likely post-dates origins of the medieval tradition of arboreal glosses of the ogham letters, so is more probably influenced by this tradition than an independent source for the meaning of ailm.

Bríatharogam 
In the medieval kennings, called Bríatharogaim or Word Ogham the verses associated with ailm are:

 - "loudest groan" in the Bríatharogam Morann mic Moín

 - "beginning of an answer"  in the Bríatharogam Mac ind Óc

 - "beginning of calling"  in the Bríatharogam Con Culainn.

References

Ogham letters